Kintsugi is the Japanese art of repairing broken pottery with lacquer dusted or mixed with powdered gold, silver, or platinum.

Kintsugi may also refer to:

 Kintsugi (album), a 2015 album by Death Cab for Cutie
 "Kintsugi", a 2019 song by Gabrielle Aplin from the album Dear Happy